Mona Vale is a suburb of Sydney, in the state of New South Wales, Australia. It is located 28 kilometres north of the Sydney central business district, in an area known as the Northern Beaches. Formerly the administrative centre of Pittwater Council, it is now located in the local government area of Northern Beaches Council. The traditional custodians of the area are the Garigal people.  It is often colloquially referred to as "Mona".

History 
The area was known as "Bongin Bongin" by Aboriginal Peoples. The initial land grants in the district of Pittwater were not made until April 1813, and those sections which now comprise Mona Vale, first surveyed in May 1814, were granted to Robert Campbell (1769-1846). These were originally part of  that extended northwards from Mona Vale to the end of Newport beach. Local lore suggests the name Mona Vale was chosen by Campbell in remembrance of a town bearing the same name in Scotland, however the exact location of this place remains a mystery.

Pittwater Council, after the council chambers moved from Warriewood. Since then, Pittwater Council has been amalgamated with Warringah and Manly to form the Northern Beaches Council.

Landmarks
Mona Vale has two primary schools and a high school, an RSL club, a park, public library, golf course, hospital, a world class skate park, a bus depot, three supermarkets, and a variety of shops and businesses. There are also a number of pathways and walking tracks around the area.

Mona Vale Hospital is the local public healthcare facility, which has been undergoing a process of re-development since the opening of the newly built Northern Beaches Hospital.

Mona Vale has a shallow beach (formerly known as "Bongin Bongin" Beach) which has a children's and lap pool at its northern end, with the main beach adjoining the golf course and a number of parks and reserves. There is a second beach north of this which is known as "The Basin" with a concentrated wave which, since the early 2000s, has been known as "Whomp" which is popular with body boarders. Mona Vale is a popular beach for surfing with beach breaks including "Main", "Suck Rock" which holds the annual competition known as KOTR or king of the rock, and "Rip Bowl" THE GALD IS KING OF MV .

Population
In the 2016 Census there were 10,670 people domiciled in Mona Vale, of which 70.7% of these were born in Australia. The most common other countries of birth were England 8.0%, New Zealand 2.2% and South Africa 1.4%. The area is relatively linguistically homogeneous, with 84.8% of residents speaking only English at home. Other languages spoken at home included Serbian 1.1%, German 1.0% and Croatian 1.0%. The most common responses for religion were No Religion 30.6%, Catholic 24.5% and Anglican 20.7%.

Transport
Mona Vale is located at the junction of two major roads (Mona Vale Road A3 and Pittwater Road A8) and is accessible by B-Line bus from central Sydney (Wynyard Station). There is a local bus depot located on Darley Street.

Churches
Mona Vale is home to the following churches:

 Sacred Heart Catholic Church
 Mona Vale Anglican Church
Christian Life Centre
Mona Vale Seventh-day Adventist Church
Healing Word Church
Pittwater Wesleyan Methodist Church
Ignite Cafe Church

Education
Mona Vale is home to three schools; two primary and one secondary:
 Sacred Heart Catholic Primary School
 Mona Vale Public School
 Pittwater High School

Sports
Whilst many of the outdoor activities which take place in Mona Vale are aquatic, the suburb is also home to a variety of sporting clubs and associations:

 Mona Vale Raiders Rugby League Club
 Pittwater RSL Soccer Club
 Peninsula Netball Club
 Mona Vale Cricket Club
 Peninsula Junior Cricket Club
 Mona Vale Surf Lifesaving Club 
 Mona Vale Boardriders
 Mona Vale Commodores Netball Club
 Pittwater Tigers AFL Club
 Pittwater Aquatic Club

References

External links

Mona Vale Hospital

Suburbs of Sydney
Northern Beaches Council